

The Wesleyan Building (est.1870) of Boston, Massachusetts, is located on Bromfield Street in the vicinity of Downtown Crossing. Architects Joseph Billings and Hammatt Billings designed it as the headquarters of the Methodist Boston Wesleyan Association. Tenants have included the New-England Methodist Historical Society; Zion's Herald; Woman's Foreign Missionary Society of the Methodist Episcopal Church; Boston Lyceum Bureau; Boston Theological Seminary; Boston University School of Law; Emerson College of Oratory; and Hudl. By  1912 the Methodists had moved to a new building on Copley Square.

References

Images

External links

 Boston Landmarks Commission. Photos, 1973:
 Wesleyan Association Building, 32-38 Bromfield Street, Boston
 Wesleyan Association Building, Bromfield Street
 Wesleyan Association Building, Bromfield Street

Commercial buildings completed in 1870
Financial District, Boston
Buildings and structures in Boston